Boonville (formerly The Corners and Kendall's City) is a census-designated place (CDP) in Mendocino County, California, United States. The population was 1,018 at the 2020 census.

History
Boonville was founded by John Bregartes in 1862. It was originally called "The Corners". Bregartes built a hotel there, and in 1864 Alonzo Kendall built another. The town became known as "Kendall's City". W.W. Boone bought a store in town and gave the place its current name.

The first post office opened in 1875, having been transferred from Anderson.

Geography
State Route 128 passes through the town, leading southeast  to U.S. Route 101 at Cloverdale and northwest the same distance to the Pacific Ocean near Albion. State Route 253 leads east from Boonville  to Route 101 near Ukiah.

The town is drained by Anderson Creek, a northwest-flowing tributary of the Navarro River, which leads to the Pacific Ocean near Albion.

Climate
The region experiences warm (but not hot) and dry summers, with no average monthly temperatures above 71.6 °F.  According to the Köppen Climate Classification system, Boonville has a warm-summer Mediterranean climate, abbreviated "Csb" on climate maps.

Demographics

The 2010 United States Census reported that Boonville had a population of 1,035. The racial makeup of Boonville was 630 (60.9%) White, 9 (0.9%) African American, 18 (1.7%) Native American, 7 (0.7%) Asian, 2 (0.2%) Pacific Islander, 340 (32.9%) from other races, and 29 (2.8%) from two or more races. Hispanic or Latino of any race were 520 persons (50.2%).

The Census reported that 1,029 people (99.4% of the population) lived in households, 1 (0.1%) lived in non-institutionalized group quarters, and 5 (0.5%) were institutionalized.

There were 372 households, out of which 139 (37.4%) had children under the age of 18 living in them, 193 (51.9%) were opposite-sex married couples living together, 46 (12.4%) had a female householder with no husband present, 23 (6.2%) had a male householder with no wife present.  There were 28 (7.5%) unmarried opposite-sex partnerships, and 4 (1.1%) same-sex married couples or partnerships. 77 households (20.7%) were made up of individuals, and 28 (7.5%) had someone living alone who was 65 years of age or older. The average household size was 2.77.  There were 262 families (70.4% of all households); the average family size was 3.12.

The population was spread out, with 268 people (25.9%) under the age of 18, 90 people (8.7%) aged 18 to 24, 270 people (26.1%) aged 25 to 44, 275 people (26.6%) aged 45 to 64, and 132 people (12.8%) who were 65 years of age or older.  The median age was 36.8 years. For every 100 females, there were 112.1 males.  For every 100 females age 18 and over, there were 114.2 males.

The homeowner vacancy rate was 0%; the rental vacancy rate was 4.2%.  479 people (46.3% of the population) lived in owner-occupied housing units and 550 people (53.1%) lived in rental housing units.

Education

Elementary school students in Boonville attend Anderson Valley Elementary School. Middle and high school students attend Anderson Valley Junior-Senior High School. Both schools are located in Boonville.

Politics

Culture

Boonville is best known as the source of the Boontling folk language. Bottles from the local Anderson Valley Brewing Company are labeled with the motto "Bahl Hornin'" which means "It's good drinkin'" in Boontling.

An Alsatian Varietals wine festival is held at the fairgrounds each February. In early spring (April or May), the annual Legendary Boonville Beer Festival is held at the fairgrounds, featuring beers from about 50 craft breweries. A Pinot Noir Festival is held in May. In July, the Wool-growers' Barbecue and Sheepdog Trials is held at the fairgrounds. Boonville hosts the annual Mendocino County Fair in September. Boonville also hosts the long-running Sierra Nevada World Music Festival every summer solstice weekend in June.

The apple cultivar known as Sierra Beauty is attributed to have been located on a mountainside by itself. Cuttings were made and grafted allowing the cultivar to survive. The Gowan family of Sonoma was one of the early growers that helped save this cultivar from extinction.

Boonville, despite its small population, has a minor reputation among political leftists in the United States for countercultural ideals, including promotion of organic food. The town serves as the setting for the novel Boonville (2001) by Robert Mailer Anderson and is mentioned in Sourdough (2017) by Robin Sloan. Some commentators believe Boonville may be the setting for the novel Vineland (1990) by Thomas Pynchon.

The town is known to Unificationists as the site of the successful but ill-fated Creative Community Project.

The ZIP Code is 95415. The community is inside area code 707.

The 2008 American science fiction action horror thriller film Pig Hunt is set and shot in Boonville.

The 2016 Western film Boonville Redemption is set in Boonville in 1906.

Boonville is home of the Boonville stomp, a dance invented by a forestry worker named Maudie in the early 1900s. Les Claypool has a song called "Boonville Stomp" on his album Of Fungi and Foe which was also featured in the film Pig Hunt and includes a shout-out to the film's producer and writer Robert Mailer Anderson.

Notable residents
 Robert Mailer Anderson, novelist, screenwriter, playwright and activist; 1987 graduate of Anderson Valley High School
 René Auberjonois, Emmy award-nominated actor, former resident
 Gabriela Lena Frank, award-winning composer (Latin Grammy, Guggenheim, USA Artist) and Grammy-nominated pianist
 Martin Tevaseu, football player for the Indianapolis Colts
 In the spring of 1968 a number of Manson Family members lived for a few months in a residence between Boonville and Philo. Due to drug accusations the residence was raided on June 24 and the inhabitants were arrested. Among the accused were Mary Brunner, Ella Jo Bailey, Susan Atkins and Patricia Krenwinkel. After the Boonville raid they left the area.

See also
 Boontling
 Boont ale

References

External links

 The Anderson Valley Advertiser - the weekly newspaper of Anderson Valley

Census-designated places in Mendocino County, California
Populated places established in 1862
1862 establishments in California
Census-designated places in California